Impermanence, also known as the philosophical problem of change, is a philosophical concept addressed in a variety of religions and philosophies. In Eastern philosophy it is notable for its role in the Buddhist three marks of existence. It is also an element of Hinduism. In Western philosophy it is most famously known through its first appearance in Greek philosophy in the writings of Heraclitus and in his doctrine of panta rhei (everything flows). In Western philosophy the concept is also referred to as becoming.

Indian religions

The Pali word for impermanence, anicca, is a compound word consisting of "a" meaning non-, and "nicca" meaning "constant, continuous, permanent". While 'nicca' is the concept of continuity and permanence, 'anicca' refers to its exact opposite; the absence of permanence and continuity. The term is synonymous with the Sanskrit term anitya (a + nitya). The concept of impermanence is prominent in Buddhism, and it is also found in various schools of Hinduism and Jainism. The term also appears in the Rigveda.

Buddhism

Impermanence, called anicca (Pāli) or anitya (Sanskrit), appears extensively in the Pali Canon as one of the essential doctrines of Buddhism., Quote: "All phenomenal existence [in Buddhism] is said to have three interlocking characteristics: impermanence, suffering and lack of soul or essence." The doctrine asserts that all of conditioned existence, without exception, is "transient, evanescent, inconstant". All temporal things, whether material or mental, are compounded objects in a continuous change of condition, subject to decline and destruction. All physical and mental events are not metaphysically real. They are not constant or permanent; they come into being and dissolve.

Anicca is understood in Buddhism as the first of the three marks of existence (trilakshana), the other two being dukkha (suffering, pain, unsatisfactoriness) and anatta (non-self, non-soul, no essence). It appears in Pali texts as, "sabbe sankhara anicca, sabbe sankhara dukkha, sabbe dhamma anatta", which Szczurek translates as, "all conditioned things are impermanent, all conditioned things are painful, all dhammas are without Self".

All physical and mental events, states Buddhism, come into being and dissolve. Human life embodies this flux in the aging process, the cycle of repeated birth and death (Samsara), nothing lasts, and everything decays. This is applicable to all beings and their environs, including beings who have reincarnated in deva (god) and naraka (hell) realms.

Anicca is intimately associated with the doctrine of anatta, according to which things have no essence, permanent self, or unchanging soul.[a] [b] , Quote: "(...) anatta is the doctrine of non-self, and is an extreme empiricist doctrine that holds that the notion of an unchanging permanent self is a fiction and has no reality. According to Buddhist doctrine, the individual person consists of five skandhas or heaps - the body, feelings, perceptions, impulses and consciousness. The belief in a self or soul, over these five skandhas, is illusory and the cause of suffering."[c] , Quote: "(...) Buddha's teaching that beings have no soul, no abiding essence. This 'no-soul doctrine' (anatta-vada) he expounded in his second sermon." The Buddha taught that because no physical or mental object is permanent, desires for or attachments to either causes suffering (dukkha). Understanding Anicca and Anatta are steps in the Buddhist's spiritual progress toward enlightenment.

Everything, whether physical or mental, is a formation (Saṅkhāra), has a dependent origination and is impermanent. It arises, changes and disappears. According to Buddhism, everything in human life, all objects, as well as all beings whether in heavenly or hellish or earthly realms in Buddhist cosmology, is always changing, inconstant, undergoes rebirth and redeath (Samsara). This impermanence is a source of dukkha. This is in contrast to nirvana, the reality that is nicca, or knows no change, decay or death.

Rupert Gethin on Four Noble Truths says:

Hinduism
The term Anitya (अनित्य), in the sense of impermanence of objects and life, appears in verse 1.2.10 of the Katha Upanishad, one of the Principal Upanishads of Hinduism.Paul Deussen, Sixty Upanishads of the Veda, Volume 1, Motilal Banarsidass, page 283 with footnote 1 It asserts that everything in the world is impermanent, but impermanent nature of things is an opportunity to obtain what is permanent (nitya) as the Hindu scripture presents its doctrine about Atman (Self). The term Anitya also appears in the Bhagavad Gita in a similar context.

Buddhism and Hinduism share the doctrine of Anicca or Anitya, that is "nothing lasts, everything is in constant state of change"; however, they disagree on the Anatta doctrine, that is whether Self exists or not. Even in the details of their respective impermanence theories, state Frank Hoffman and Deegalle Mahinda, Buddhist and Hindu traditions differ. Change associated with Anicca and associated attachments produces sorrow or Dukkha asserts Buddhism and therefore need to be discarded for liberation (nibbana), while Hinduism asserts that not all change and attachments lead to Dukkha and some change – mental or physical or self-knowledge – leads to happiness and therefore need to be sought for liberation (moksha). The Nicca (permanent) in Buddhism is anatta (non-soul), the Nitya in Hinduism is atman (Self).

Western philosophy

Impermanence first appears in Greek philosophy in the writings of Heraclitus and his doctrine of panta rhei (everything flows). Heraclitus was famous for his insistence on ever-present change as being the fundamental essence of the universe, as stated in the famous saying, "No man ever steps in the same river twice" This is commonly considered to be a key contribution in the development of the philosophical concept of becoming, as contrasted with "being", and has sometimes been seen in a dialectical relationship with Parmenides' statement that "whatever is, is, and what is not cannot be", the latter being understood as a key contribution in the development of the philosophical concept of being. For this reason, Parmenides and Heraclitus are commonly considered to be two of the founders of ontology. Scholars have generally believed that either Parmenides was responding to Heraclitus, or Heraclitus to Parmenides, though opinion on who was responding to whom has varied over the course of the 20th and 21st centuries. Heraclitus' position was complemented by his stark commitment to a unity of opposites in the world, stating that "the path up and down are one and the same". Through these doctrines Heraclitus characterized all existing entities by pairs of contrary properties, whereby no entity may ever occupy a single state at a single time. This, along with his cryptic utterance that "all entities come to be in accordance with this Logos" (literally, "word", "reason", or "account") has been the subject of numerous interpretations.

Impermanence was widely but not universally accepted among subsequent Greek philosophers. Democritus' theory of atoms entailed that assemblages of atoms were impermanent. Pyrrho declared that everything was astathmēta (unstable), and anepikrita (unfixed). Plutarch commented on impermanence saying "And if the nature which is measured is subject to the same conditions as the time which measures it, this nature itself has no permanence, nor "being," but is becoming and perishing according to its relation to time. The Stoic philosopher, Marcus Aurelius' Meditations contains many comments about impermanence, such as “Bear in mind that everything that exists is already fraying at the edges, and in transition, subject to fragmentation and to rot.” (10.18)

Plato rejected impermanence, arguing against Heraclitus:How can that be a real thing which is never in the same state? ... for at the moment that the observer approaches, then they become other ... so that you cannot get any further in knowing their nature or state .... but if that which knows and that which is known exist ever ... then I do not think they can resemble a process or flux ....

Several famous Roman Latin sayings are about impermanence, including Omnia mutantur, Sic transit gloria mundi, and Tempora mutantur.

In arts and culture
 Akio Jissoji's Buddhist auteur film Mujo (also known as This Transient Life) owes its title to the doctrine of Impermanence.
 Impermanence is the title of a novella by Daniel Frisano.
 Impermanence'' is the title of the 7th track on For Those That Wish To Exist by Architects.

See also

 Reality in Buddhism
 Hōjōki
 Mono no aware
 The Tale of the Heike
 Wabi-sabi
 Philosophy of space and time
 Process philosophy
 Temporality
 Vanitas

References

External links

The Buddhist Philosophy of Universal Flux (1935) by Satkari Mookerjee
All About Change by Thanissaro Bhikkhu
Three marks of existence by Nyanaponika Thera
Time and Temporality: A Buddhist Approach, Kenneth K. Inada (1974), Philosophy East and West
What is impermanence? Buddhism for Beginners

Buddhist philosophical concepts
Change
Concepts in ancient Greek philosophy of mind
Concepts in ancient Greek metaphysics
Concepts in metaphilosophy
Concepts in the philosophy of mind
Concepts in the philosophy of science
Hindu philosophical concepts
Metaphilosophy
Metaphysical theories